The 2013 J.League Division 2 season is the 42nd season of the second-tier club football in Japan and the 15th season since the establishment of J2 League. The regular season began on 3 March and ended on 24 November, followed by the promotion play-offs among four clubs ranked between 3rd and 6th at the end of regular season. Gamba Osaka became champions, and Vissel Kobe became runners-up, both returned to J1 immediately after one season at J2. The other promoted team is third runners-up (fourth placers) Tokushima Vortis, who won the promotion playoff final, defeating Kyoto Sanga FC. With the win, Vortis are making their J1 debut, becoming the first professional Shikoku football club to compete in the top division of their national league.

Clubs
Ventforet Kofu and Shonan Bellmare, champions and runners-up in the previous season, and Oita Trinita, winners of the promotion play-offs for 2012, were promoted to J1, then Consadole Sapporo, Vissel Kobe, and Gamba Osaka were relegated to J2 instead. Sapporo returned to J2 only after one season in the top-flight, and Kobe returned to J2 second time after 2006 season, while Gamba suffers their very first relegation to the second-tier after J.League Division 2 was established in 1999, and the first relegation since their former organization, Matsushita Electric Soccer Club, were relegated after the 1986–87 season of JSL.

V-Varen Nagasaki, champions of the 2012 Japan Football League, are promoted to J2 while F.C. Machida Zelvia, promoted to J2 from the previous season and ranked 22nd, were relegated back to 2013 Japan Football League only after spending one season in J2.

In February, Thespa Kusatsu changed their name to Thespakusatsu Gunma.

The participant clubs are as follows:

League table

Results

Play-offs

Promotion Playoffs to Division 1
2013 J.League Road To J1 play-offs (2013 J1昇格プレーオフ)
Teams that finished 3rd to 6th participate in play-off series for the last J1 promotion berth.

Semifinals

If the score is tied after 90 minutes, no extra time is played and the winner is the team with the best league ranking.

Final

Tokushima Vortis were promoted to 2014 J.League Division 1

JFL Relegation Playoffs
2013 J2/JFL play-offs (2013 J2・JFL入れ替え戦)
The last-placed Gainare Tottori faced 2013 Japan Football League runners-up Kamatamare Sanuki in a two-legged playoff series.

Gainare Tottori was relegated to 2014 J3 League
Kamatamare Sanuki was promoted to 2014 J.League Division 2

Top scorers

Updated to games played on 24 November 2013
Source: J. League

Awards

Player of the Month

Attendances

References

J2 League seasons
2
Japan
Japan